Cakalele: Maluku Research Journal/Majalah Penelitian Maluku is an academic journal that publishes the results of research about Maluku and Maluku communities in Indonesia and the Netherlands. The journal chronicles the growth of Maluku in humanities and the sciences as it expands geographically. Cakalele is stored on the ScholarSpace institutional repository of the University of Hawaii at Manoa. The journal was founded by linguist James T. Collins.

References

External links 
 Cakalele on ScholarSpace

Area studies journals
Publications established in 1990
Publications disestablished in 2000
University of Hawaiʻi Press academic journals
Annual journals
Ethnology journals
Cultural journals
Academic journals published by university libraries